Jawahar Navodaya Vidyalaya, East Sikkim or locally known as JNV Pakyong is a boarding, co-educational  school in East Sikkim district of Sikkim state in India. Navodaya Vidyalayas are funded by the Indian Ministry of Human Resources Development and administered  by Navodaya Vidyalaya Smiti, an autonomous body under the ministry. Navodaya Vidyalayas offer free education to talented children from Class VI to XII.

History 
The school was established in 1992, and is a part of Jawahar Navodaya Vidyalaya schools. The school shifted to its permanent campus in 2017. This school is administered and monitored by Shillong regional office of Navodaya Vidyalaya Smiti.

Admission 
Admission to JNV Pakyong at class VI level is made through selection test conducted by Navodaya Vidyalaya Smiti. The information about test is disseminated and advertised in district by the office of East Sikkim district magistrate (Collector), who is also the chairperson of Vidyalya Management Committee.

Affiliations 
JNV East Sikkim is affiliated to Central Board of Secondary Education with affiliation number 1840004.

See also 
 Jawahar Navodaya Vidyalaya, West Sikkim
 Jawahar Navodaya Vidyalaya, North Sikkim
 Jawahar Navodaya Vidyalaya, South Sikkim
 List of Jawahar Navodaya Vidyalaya schools

References

External links 

 Official Website of JNV East Sikkim

High schools and secondary schools in Sikkim
East Sikkim
Educational institutions established in 1992
1992 establishments in Sikkim